737 Naval Air Squadron (737 NAS) was a Naval Air Squadron of the Royal Navy's Fleet Air Arm. It was initially active during 1943 as an amphibious Bomber Reconnaissance Training Squadron. Reactivated in 1944 it operated as an ASV Training Unit until 1945. It was active again between 1949 and 1957. From 1959 it was the Anti-Submarine Warfare school at RNAS Portland. It operated Westland Wessex HAS.3 rescue helicopters from their land base at RNAS Portland, Dorset.

History

Bomber Reconnaissance Training Squadron (1943)
737 Naval Air Squadron was formed at RNAS Dunino (HMS Jackdaw II) on 22 February 1943, as an amphibious Bomber Reconnaissance Training Squadron with Supermarine Walrus, until 28 September 1943.

ASV Training Unit (1944 - 1945)
The squadron then reformed as an ASV (Air-to-Surface Vessel) radar Training Unit at RNAS Inskip (HMS Nightjar) on 15 March 1944 remaining until 28th August 1944, when it then moved to  RNAS Arbroath (HMS Condor), the unit was equipped with Fairey Swordfish Mk II and Avro Anson Mk I.

On 15 April 1945 737 NAS moved to RNAS Burscough (HMS Ringtail). It received Fairey Barracuda Mk III in the following August. Other aircraft included Fairey Swordfish Mk II and Avro Anson Mk I. Crews were trained in the use of A.S.V. Mk X and XI radar for anti shipping operations. The squadron disbanded into 735 NAS in November 1945.

At RNAS Eglinton (1949 - 1957)
The squadron reformed on 30 March 1949 at RNAS Eglinton (HMS Gannet). During the month of July in 1951 737 NAS was involved in a trial around the suitability of the British Radio Directional Sonobuoy Mk 1 for Fleet Air Arm aircraft.

On 22 November 1957, the squadron disbanded at Eglinton.

At RNAS Portland (1959 - 1983)
737 NAS reformed again on the 28 August 1959 at RNAS Portland as the Royal Navy Anti-Submarine Wafare School acquiring Westland Whirlwind HAR.3 from the remains of 815 NAS which disbanded. It then took on Westland Whirlwind HAS.7 roughly 1 month later.

From July 1962 the squadron operated Westland Wessex HAS.1, then in October 1967 it took on deliveries of Westland Wessex HAS.3. Taking over from 829 NAS, in June 1970, 737 NAS became responsible for the Wessex Flights aboard the remaining County Class Destroyers.

July 1970 saw the squadron take the Westland Sea King HAS.1, the first anti-submarine version for the Royal Navy. In May 1972, 737 NAS took over Anti-Submarine Warfare Operational and Advanced Flying Training, with the squadron regularly detached to RFA Engadine for seaborne training. The Sea King helicopters were later passed over to 826 NAS in June 1975, enabling 737 NAS to concentrate on Wessex HAS.3 training duties. On the 7th February 1983, 737 NAS disbanded at RNAS Portland, handing over its Wessex HAS.3 helicopters to  772 NAS.

Helicopter-only squadron
From 28 August 1959 the squadron only used helicopters.

737 NAS was assigned to operate from Helicopter Support Ship RFA Engadine and later, from the flight decks of the eight County Class guided missile destroyers, including HMS Glamorgan (D19), HMS Antrim (D18) and HMS Norfolk (D21). 737 Squadron supported flights on these destroyers in addition to providing aircrew training at RNAS Portland.

In their ship-borne, anti-submarine role, the HAS.3s could carry two Mark 44 torpedoes or Mark 46 torpedoes (with parachutes) or four Mk.11 Depth Charges in addition to their Plessey dipping Sonar. They could also be fitted with a door-mounted Machine gun and act as a self-contained unit, handling all operations of Anti-submarine warfare(ASW).

Throughout the late 1970s most of the Wessex HAS.3 helicopters at RNAS Portland were being replaced by Westland Sea Kings, which could carry more torpedoes or depth charges and had the security of twin engines, with greatly extended endurance.

Falklands War

 was the Flagship of Operation Paraquet, the recovery of South Georgia in April 1982. Her helicopter, Westland Wessex HAS.3 XP142, nicknamed Humphrey, was responsible for the rescue of 16 SAS men from Fortuna Glacier and the subsequent detection and disabling of the Argentine submarine Santa Fe. Another HAS.3, XM837, was lost in June 1982 when an Exocet missile hit the hangar on the destroyer . A few HAS.3s remained in service after the Falklands War period. One of these, XP142, was seriously damaged near San Carlos Water and was replaced  on HMS Antrim by XM328 in November 1982. XM328 then sailed with HMS Antrim on her second deployment to the South Atlantic.

Decommissioning
XM328 was transferred to 772 Naval Air Squadron when 737 Squadron disbanded on 4 February 1983.
XP142 is preserved in the Fleet Air Arm Museum at Yeovilton.

Aircraft flown
The squadron operated a variety of different aircraft and versions:

 Supermarine Walrus
 Fairey Swordfish II
 Avro Anson  I
 Fairey Barracuda TR.3
 Supermarine Seafire F.15 & F.17
 Fairey Firefly FR.1/T.1/T.2/FR.4/AS.5 & AS.6
 Fairey Gannet AS.1 & T.2
 Westland Whirlwind HAR.3, HAS.7 & HAS.22
 Westland Wessex HAS.1 & HAS.3
 Westland Sea King HAS.1

References

Citations

Bibliography

700 series Fleet Air Arm squadrons
Military units and formations of the United Kingdom in the Falklands War